All Jokes Aside is a 2000 documentary about black comedians performing in the comedy club All Jokes Aside.

References

External links 
 

2000 films
Documentary films about comedy and comedians
Documentary films about African Americans
2000s English-language films